David Lovelock (born 1938) is a British theoretical physicist and mathematician. He is known for Lovelock theory of gravity and the Lovelock's theorem.

Notes

Books

External links

 David Lovelock Personal Home Page

1938 births
British mathematicians
British relativity theorists
Living people